Tengen (天元, center or origin of heaven) is a Go competition in Japan.

The name Tengen refers to the center point on a Go board.

The event is held annually, and has run continuously since its inauguration in 1975.

Tengen competition (天元戦) 
The Tengen competition is a Go tournament run by the Japanese Nihon-Kiin and Kansai-Kiin. The Tengen is the 5th of the 7 big titles in Japanese Go.

It has the same format as the other tournaments. There is a preliminary tournament, which is single knockout, where the winner faces the holder in a best-of-five match.

Before the 6th Tengen, the format was different. Instead of the title holder waiting for a challenger, it would be the two Go players left from the single knockout tournament who then played a best-of-five match to determine the holder.

The tournament was formed from a merger between the Nihon Ki-in and Kansai Ki-in championships. The former ran from 1954 to 1975.

Past winners

Trivia 
 The first player to defend the title was Kato Masao who won four consecutive terms in the 4th-7th Tengen. 
 Rin Kaiho surpassed this with a record five consecutive wins in the 15th-19th  Tengen.  
 Iyama Yuta equaled this record in the 41st-45th terms, and has won the title a record eight times over nine terms starting with the 37th.

See also 

 Honorary Tengen
 Go professional
 China–Japan Tengen
 China–Korea Tengen
 International Go Federation

References

External links
 Tengen – Nihon Ki-in (in Japanese)
 Full tournament grid since the 33rd edition
 Full tournament results and game records

Tengen